Russell Spencer (born 1st March 1980) he is an English singer and television presenter.

Scooch 
Originally formed in 1998, Spencer first gained prominence as a member of pop group Scooch who signed to EMI and gained four top twenty hits including their top five single "More Than I Needed to Know", as well as the album Four Sure. Worldwide, Scooch scored number one singles in Japan and Australia, although were dropped by EMI and disbanded after the disappointing sales of Four Sure in 2000.

In 2007, Scooch reformed after seven years to participate on Eurovision: Making Your Mind Up, a BBC television contest to determine the United Kingdom's entry in the 2007 Eurovision Song Contest in Finland. They were chosen as the UK's entry, beating, amongst others, Justin Hawkins and Brian Harvey. Russ co-wrote the song "Flying the Flag (For You)", signed to Warner Bros. Records and released the song to the UK chart. The UK Eurovision entry automatically goes to the final, where the song received only 19 votes, coming joint 22nd out of 24 entries. However, the single was the highest charting Eurovision song in the UK since 1997 when Katrina and the Waves last won the contest for the country, reaching the number five position.

Television 
Spencer has hosted shows such as the ITV game show Make Your Play, and presenting three nights a week for The Great Big British Quiz on Channel 5. Other presenting credits include MTV, Disney Channel, Quiz Call, Quiz TV and Glitterball for ITV. He has also appeared on Never Mind the Buzzcocks, The Most Annoying Pop Moments... We Hate to Love and Generation X for the BBC. For VH1 he has appeared in Wannabe and Radio Ga Ga. Television acting work includes guest roles in series six of Shameless on Channel 4 and Footballers' Wives on ITV.

Spencer starred in the E4 series Boys Will Be Girls where a new band was formed but the members had to pass themselves off as being female. Early in 2010, Spencer appeared alongside fellow Scooch band member and partner Caroline Barnes on the Channel 4 series Coach Trip. They were red-carded on day 36, after 19 days on the coach, for having broken the rules by asking others to vote them off.

Theatre 
Trained at Laine Theatre Arts, Spencer's theatre work includes the original West End cast of "Nine', the UK national tour of Chitty Chitty Bang Bang starring as 'The Child Catcher' alongside Craig McLachlan.

He created the role of 'Ricky St Clair' in the UK tour of Dave Simpson's The eXtra Factor, and played 'Joe' in Santa Claus – The Musical alongside Anita Dobson and Roy Barraclough at the Alexandra Theatre in Birmingham. He has also been in Wayne Sleep’s Explosive Dance and Andrew Lloyd Webber’s Birthday Celebration both at the Royal Albert Hall, and a world tour as lead vocalist with the New Zealand and Hawaii Symphony orchestras.

Numerous pantomime appearances include starring in Cinderella, Puss in Boots and Snow White.

Radio 
In 2008, Spencer was a DJ on the independent local radio station 107.8 Radio Jackie.

References

External links 
Russ Spencer official website
Radio Jackie profile

Living people
1980 births
English television presenters
English male singers
Musicians from Bournemouth
Eurovision Song Contest entrants for the United Kingdom
Eurovision Song Contest entrants of 2007
21st-century English singers
21st-century British male singers
English people of Scottish descent
Mass media people from Bournemouth